Kim is a male and female unisex given name. It is also used as a diminutive or nickname for names such as Kimber, Kimberly, Kimberley, Kimball  and Kimiko. In Kenya it is short for various male names such as Kimutai and Kimani. In Vietnam it is also a unisex name.

A notable use of the name was the fictional street urchin Kimball O'Hara in Rudyard Kipling's book Kim, published in 1901. The name is also found in the opening of Edna Ferber's 1926 novel Show Boat, whose female protagonist, Magnolia names her baby daughter Kim; the name was inspired by the convergence of the three states Kentucky, Illinois, and Missouri – where the child was born.

From the 1900s to the 1960s, the name Kim was mainly given to boys, despite the use of this name for both male and female characters in popular literature and, later, movies of the time. In Scandinavia Kim can more often be used as a male name in its own right, being a common short form of Joakim.

In Russia  (Kim) is a diminutive/nickname of Ioakim, "Joachim".

Notable people

Movies and TV
 Kim Atienza (born 1967), known professionally as Kim Atienza or Kuya Kim, is a Filipino television host, actor, weather anchor and a former politician
 Kim Basinger (born 1953), American actress
 Kim Bodnia (born 1965), Danish actor and director
 Kim Cattrall (born 1956), Canadian actress 
 Kim Chiu (born 1990), Filipino actress and singer
 Kim Coates (born 1958), Canadian actor 
 Kim Domingo (born 1995), Filipino actress, model, singer and television presenter
 Kim Fields (born 1969), American actress
 Kim Henkel (born 1946), American screenwriter and director
 Kim Manners (1951–2009), American television director and producer
 Kim Novak (born 1933), American actress
 Kim O'Brien, American actress active from 1974 to 1987
 Kim Richards (born 1964), American reality television personality, actress and socialite
 Kim Rossi Stuart (born 1969), Italian actor and film director
 Kim Spradlin (born 1983), American television personality, interior designer and former bridal shop owner
 Kim Woodburn (born 1942), English television personality & expert cleaner
 Kim Yashpal (Kim; active from 1979), Indian film actress and model

Musicians
 Kim Appleby (born 1961), British singer
 Kim Carnes (born 1945), American singer 
 Kim Cascone (born 1955), American electronic music composer 
 Kim Deal (born 1961), American musician
 Kim Gannon (1900-1974), American songwriter
 Kim Gordon (born 1953), American musician
 Lil' Kim (born Kimberly Denise Jones) (born 1974), American rapper
 Kim Ljung (born 1971), Norwegian musician
 Kim Mitchell (born 1952), Canadian musician and radio personality
 Kim Molina (born 1991), Filipina singer
 Kim Moyes (born 1976), Australian musician
 Kim Petersen (born 1956), also known as King Diamond, Danish singer
 Kim Petras (born 1992), German singer
 Kimberley Rew (born 1951), English singer-songwriter
 Kim Thayil (born 1960), American musician, lead guitarist for Soundgarden
 Kim Walker-Smith (born 1981), American singer-songwriter, worship leader for the Jesus Culture Band
 Kim Wilde (born 1960), English singer
 Kim Wyatt (born 1982), American singer and dancer
 Kim Zolciak-Biermann (born 1978), American singer and reality star from The Real Housewives of Atlanta

Politics
 Kim Aas (1970), Danish politician
 Kim Beazley (born 1948), Australian politician, son of Kim Beazley Sr.
 Kim Beazley Sr. (1917–2007), Australian politician
 Kim Campbell (born 1947), first and only (to date) female Canadian Prime Minister
 Kim Carr (born 1955), Australian politician
 Kim Guadagno (born 1959), New Jersey politician
 Kim Kataguiri (born 1996), Brazilian political activist
 Kim Richards (born 1971), Australian politician
 Trần Trọng Kim (1883–1953), Vietnamese Prime Minister during Japanese occupation

Sports
 Carlos Henrique Dias, Brazilian footballer nicknamed "Kim"
 Kim Amb, Swedish javelin thrower
 Kim Barnett (born 1960), former English cricketer
 Kim Batiste, American baseball player
 Kim Bokamper, American football player
 Kim Boutin, Canadian short track ice skater
 Kim Chizevsky-Nicholls, IFBB professional bodybuilder
 Kim Clijsters (born 1983), Belgian tennis player
 Kim Eagles (born 1976), Canadian sport shooter
 Kim English, American basketball player
 Kim Gevaert, Belgian sprint athlete
 Kim Grant (footballer), Ghanaian former footballer
 Kim Grant (tennis), South African tennis player
 Kim Green, British-Australian racing team owner and promoter
 Kim Hagger, English track and field athlete
 Kim Hirschovits, Finnish ice hockey player
 Kim Hughes, Australian cricketer
 Kim Huybrechts, Belgian darts player
 Kim Johnsson, Swedish professional ice hockey defenceman 
 Kim Källström, Swedish footballer
 Kim Kilpatrick, Canadian Paralympic swimmer
 Kim Ng (born 1968), Chinese-American professional baseball executive
 Kim Rhode, skeet shooter
 Kim Staal, Danish ice hockey player
 Kim Sunna, Swedish professional ice hockey player
 Kim Warwick, Australian former tennis player

Other people
 Kim, a Jaredite king in the Book of Mormon
 Kim Cloutier (born 1987), Canadian-American model
 Kim Deitch (born 1944), American comic book artist
 Kim Dotcom (born Kim Schmitz in 1974), German-Finnish Internet entrepreneur and political activist
 Kim Jones (disambiguation), any of several people
 Kim Kardashian (born 1980), American personality
 Kim Komando (born 1967), American talk-radio program host
 Kim Mathers, wife of Eminem, subject of song "Kim" from The Marshall Mathers LP
 Kim Newman (born 1959), English author
 Kim Peek (1951–2009), American savant
 Kim Philby (born Harold Philby, 1912–1988), British spy and defector to the Soviet Union
 Kim Smith (disambiguation), British Royal Navy Officer and submariner
 Kim Stanley Robinson (born 1952), American science fiction writer
 Kim Stolz (born 1983), American fashion model, television personality
 Kim H. Veltman (1948–2020), Dutch/Canadian historian of science and art
 Kim Wall, Swedish freelance journalist, killed by Danish entrepreneur Peter Madsen

Fictional characters
 Kim, the main protagonist in Seedfolks
 Kim Bauer in the TV series 24
 Kim Butterfield in the soap opera Hollyoaks
 Kim Chan in Have Gun Will Travel, usually called Hey Boy
 Kim Chin in Class of 3000
 Kimball Cho in the American TV series The Mentalist
 Kim Craig in the Australian sitcom Kath & Kim
 Kim Fox in the soap opera EastEnders
 Kimberly Hart in the Power Rangers franchise, portrayed by Amy Jo Johnson
 Kim Kaphwan in the Fatal Fury series
 Kim Kitsuragi in the role-playing video game Disco Elysium
 Kim Moon, a character in the American sitcom It's Garry Shandling's Show
 Kim Pine in the series of graphic novels Scott Pilgrim
 Kim Possible, animated teenage crime fighter heroine 
 Kimiko Ross in webcomic Dresden Codak
 Kim Tate in the British soap opera Emmerdale
 Kimberly Wexler in the AMC television series Better Call Saul, portrayed by Rhea Seehorn

See also
Kim (surname)
Kim (Korean surname)
Kim (disambiguation) (other meanings)
Tropical Storm Kim, tropical cyclones named Kim

References 
 

English-language unisex given names
English-language feminine given names
English-language masculine given names
English unisex given names
English feminine given names
English masculine given names
Unisex given names
Feminine given names
Masculine given names